Andrew G. Clark (born 1954) is an American population geneticist. He is currently Jacob Gould Schurman Professor of Population Genetics in the Department of Molecular Biology and Genetics and a Nancy and Peter Meinig Family Investigator at Cornell University. He is the current head of the Graduate Computation Biology field. He is also co-director of Cornell's Center for Comparative and Population Genomics and a member of a working group for the National Human Genome Research Institute.

Career
Clark received a Bachelor of Science from Brown University in 1976, followed by a Ph.D. in population genetics from Stanford University in 1980. He then worked as a postdoctoral researcher at Arizona State University and the University of Aarhus, before joining the faculty of Penn State University's Department of Biology. Since 2002, he has been a professor at Cornell University.

He was elected a fellow of the American Association for the Advancement of Science in 1994, and a member of the National Academy of Sciences in 2012. Clark's laboratory group researches genetic variation and adaptation using both human data and the laboratory model Drosophila melanogaster.

Honors 

 Elected member, National Academy of Sciences
 Elected member, American Academy of Arts and Sciences, 2016

References

External links

Andrew Clark named the first Meinig Family Investigator in the Life Sciences
Profile on Cornell Molecular Biology and Genetics Department webpage

Cornell University faculty
Living people
Brown University alumni
Stanford University alumni
1954 births